Morazán is a department of El Salvador. Located in the northeast part of the country, its capital is San Francisco Gotera. It covers a total surface area of 1,447 km² and has a population of more than 199,500.

History

Gotera was made a department in 1875, with its capital at Osicala. On February 8, 1877, Gotera was made the capital. The department changed its name from Gotera to Morazán on March 14, 1877.

Morazán was a major stronghold of the guerrilla movement during the 1979-1992 civil war. The infamous El Mozote massacre took place in this department in the village of El Mozote  on December 11, 1981, when Salvadoran armed forces killed an estimated 900 civilians in an anti-guerrilla campaign. Originally dismissed by the Salvadoran and United States governments as an invention of anti-government propaganda, the massacre was confirmed in the early 1990s through exhumation of bodies buried at the site. A museum commemorating the Salvadoran civil war, the Museum of the Revolution, was established in the municipality of Perquín.

Agriculture
Among the agricultural products that stand out are the basic grains, sugar cane, henequen, grass, orchard plants, bananas, cocoa, and coffee. Livestock cultivation of cattle, horses, donkeys and sheep is also common.

Municipalities 
 Arambala
 Cacaopera
 Chilanga
 Corinto
 Delicias de Concepción
 El Divisadero
 El Rosario
 Gualococti
 Guatajiagua
 Joateca
 Jocoaitique
 Jocoro
 Lolotiquillo
 Meanguera
 Osicala
 Perquín
 San Carlos
 San Fernando
 San Francisco Gotera
 San Isidro
 San Simón
 Sensembra
 Sociedad
 Torola
 Yamabal
 Yoloaiquín

Geography

Rio Sapo
The Sapo River is an ecotourism destination whose turquoise-colored waters have their source in the heights of the north of Morazán. The Sapo River is reached by the highway that drives from Joateca to Arambala. 1 km. after the bridge there is a deviation with access to housing operated by Prodetur.

Grotto of Corinto
Located at 48 kilometers from San Francisco Gotera, is the municipality of Corinto and a kilometer and a half to the northeast is located the "La Gruta del Espíritu Santo" (The Holy Spirit Grotto). The grotto's walls of talpetate contain a series of petroglyphs.

Perquín

The village of Perquín was founded by Lenca tribes before European settlement. It is located at 29 kilometers to the north of San Francisco Gotera. It is the site of El Salvador's Museum of The Revolution. It is also the site of the Deadman's Plain, the Bailadero del Diablo, La Cascada del Perol.
CHILANGA--------
Chilanga, is located 2 kilometers to the north of San Francisco Gotera. And is also one of the municipalities with more importance in the department. With a population of over 11,000 people it's also one of the more grown town in population. The Center of Chilanga has a public school"Dr David Turcios", a park, Catholic Church, city hall, Health Center , local court, Police precinct, Local soccer team Stadium, and many local businesses places.
Chilanga's fireworks (cohetes de Don Ciro) are popular and famous in the entire region and part of the East of the country.

External links

 Legislative Information (in Spanish)
 Tourist Information (in Spanish)

 
Departments of El Salvador
States and territories established in 1875